Jacques Tremblay is the name of:

 Jacques-Raymond Tremblay (1923–2012), Member of Parliament of Canada; Member of the National Assembly of Quebec for the Quebec Liberal Party, Iberville electoral division
 Jacques Tremblay (MNA 1985) (born 1942), former Member of the National Assembly of Quebec for the Quebec Liberal Party, Iberville electoral division